The Speaker of the Maine House of Representatives is the speaker and presiding officer of the Maine House of Representatives, the lower house of the Maine Legislature.

List of speakers

Maine
Speakers
1820 establishments in Maine